Shabestar County is in East Azerbaijan province, Iran. The capital of the county is the city of Shabestar. At the 2006 census, the county's population was 121,787 in 33,255 households. The following census in 2011 counted 124,499 people in 37,358 households. At the 2016 census, the county's population was 135,421 in 43,982 households.

Administrative divisions

The population history of Shabestar County's administrative divisions over three consecutive censuses is shown in the following table. The latest census shows three districts, eight rural districts, and nine cities.

Publications
International Journal of Forest, Soil and Erosion has been published as a peer-reviewed journal in Shabestar city since November 2011.

References

 

Counties of East Azerbaijan Province